Serkiz (Russian: Серкиз) was a Tatar prince. Born in the mid-14th century  in the Golden Horde, he became an Orthodox Christian and was baptised under the name Ivan Ivan Serkizov. He died late in the 14th century in Muscovy (now Moscow).

Biography 
There is no contemporary record of Serkiz' existence. Later records state that he led an army in the service of the Grand Duke Dmitry Donskoy. He had at least one child, Andrey Ivanovich Serkizov (died 1380).

Legacy 
Four villages in the Moscow region were named Cherkizovo or Serkizovo in his honour by Dmitry Donskoy. Serkiz is the ancestor of the Starkov family.

References 

14th-century births
14th-century deaths
Tatar Christians
Converts to Eastern Orthodoxy from Islam